Pitcairnioideae is a subfamily of the bromeliad family, Bromeliaceae. Traditionally, it was a large subfamily, comprising all those species with winged or more rarely naked seeds. Molecular phylogenetic studies showed that traditional Pitcairnioideae was not monophyletic, and the subfamily was more narrowly circumscribed. , the Encyclopaedia of Bromeliads placed five genera in the subfamily. Members of the subfamily are found from the Andes to the coast of Brazil, with one genus (Fosterella) found northwards to Mexico.

Description
Species in the subfamily Pitcairnioideae have fruits in the form of capsules with winged seeds. The petals are not joined together when the flowers open, and are usually large and conspicuous.

Taxonomy
Traditionally, the family Bromeliaceae was divided into three subfamilies based on the structure of the seeds and fruit, with Pitcairnioideae comprising all those with winged or rarely naked seeds. The other subfamilies were Bromelioideae and Tillandsioideae. A molecular phylogenetic study in 2007 showed that traditional Pitcairnioideae was not monophyletic, with Tillandsioideae embedded within it. The original broadly defined subfamily was divided it into six, including a more narrowly circumscribed Pitcairnioideae. The division was confirmed in a larger 2011 study, and is accepted by the Encyclopaedia of Bromeliads, which includes five genera in Pitcairnioideae.

Genera 
, the Encyclopaedia of Bromeliads placed five genera in the subfamily:

Former genera
Other genera that were placed in Pitcairnioideae when it was broadly defined are now put into different subfamilies.
 Brewcaria L.B.Sm., Steyerm. & H.Rob. (may be included in Navia) → Navioideae
 Brocchinia Schult.f. ex Schult. & Schult.f. → Brocchinioideae (the only genus)
 Connellia N.E.Br. → Lindmanioideae
 Cottendorfia Schult.f. → Navioideae
 Hechtia Klotzsch → Hechtioideae (only genus)
 Lindmania Mez → Lindmanioideae
 Navia Schult. & Schult.f. → Navioideae
 Puya Molina → Puyoideae (the only genus)
 Sequencia (L.B.Sm.) Givnish → Navioideae
 Steyerbromelia L.B.Sm. → Navioideae

Distribution
The subfamily is thought to have arisen in the northern Andes, spreading southwards and then eastwards into the Brazilian Shield and the easternmost part of Brazil (the "horn of Brazil"). Fosterella is also found in Mexico and Central America.

References

 http://www.ecocam.com/species/Bromeliaceae.html
 http://www.ucmp.berkeley.edu/monocots/bromeliflorae.html
 BSI - Bromeliad Info - Taxonomy
 LUTHER, H. E. (2008) An Alphabetical List of Bromeliad Binomials, Eleventh Edition The Marie Selby Botanical Gardens, Sarasota, Florida, USA. Published by The Bromeliad Society International.

 
Commelinid subfamilies